Jonathan Alexander Aranda Ventura (born May 23, 1998) is a Mexican professional baseball infielder for the Tampa Bay Rays of Major League Baseball (MLB). He made his MLB debut in 2022.

Career
Aranda signed with the Tampa Bay Rays as an international free agent on July 2, 2015. Aranda spent his professional debut season of 2016 with the Dominican Summer League Rays, hitting .257/.345/.366/.711 with 1 home run and 17 RBI. He split the 2017 season between the GCL Rays and the Princeton Rays, hitting a combined .287/.345/.348/.693 with 15 RBI and 14 stolen bases. He was named the Rays 2017 GCL MVP. Aranda split the 2018 season between Princeton and the Hudson Valley Renegades, combining to hit .269/.337/.391/.728 with 1 home run and 29 RBI. Aranda split the 2019 season between the GCL, the Bowling Green Hot Rods, and the Charlotte Stone Crabs, hitting a combined .272/.359/.383/.742 with 3 home runs and 35 RBI. He did not play in 2020 due to the cancellation of the Minor League Baseball season because of the COVID-19 pandemic. Aranda split the 2021 season between Bowling Green and the Montgomery Biscuits, hitting a combined .330/.418/.543/.962 with 14 home runs and 65 RBI. He was named the 2021 Double-A South Most Valuable Player. He was selected to the 40-man roster following the season on November 19, 2021.

Aranda began the 2022 season with the Durham Bulls. In 63 games, he hit .310/.386/.512/.898 with 11 home runs and 40 RBI. He was promoted to the majors on June 21, 2022. He made his major league debut against the Pittsburgh Pirates on June 24, 2022, going 1-for-2 with an RBI single in a 4-3 Rays victory. After the season, he was selected for the International League Most Valuable Player Award.

References

External links

1998 births
Living people
Sportspeople from Tijuana
Major League Baseball players from Mexico
Major League Baseball infielders
Tampa Bay Rays players
Dominican Summer League Rays players
Gulf Coast Rays players
Hudson Valley Renegades players
Montgomery Biscuits players
Princeton Rays players
Bowling Green Hot Rods players
Charlotte Stone Crabs players
Durham Bulls players
Yaquis de Obregón players
2023 World Baseball Classic players